Owkreka (also Romanized as Owkrekā and Owkarkā; also known as Okarkā) is a village in Peyrajeh Rural District, in the Central District of Neka County, Mazandaran Province, Iran. At the 2006 census, its population was 144, in 33 families.

References 

Populated places in Neka County